Xiè (解) is a surname. The character 解 is also pronounced "Jiě." A 2013 study found that it was the 182nd-most common surname, shred by 710,000 people or 0.053% of the population, with Shandong being the province with the most.

Notable people
 Xie Feng (politician) (Chinese: 解峰; pinyin: Xiè Fēng) (1922-2004), Chinese politician, former Governor of Hebei
 Xie Jin (mandarin) (Chinese: 解縉, 1369–1415), courtesy name Dashen (大紳), art name Chunyu (春雨), Chinese scholar-official and poet during the Ming dynasty
 Xie Zhenhua (politician), (Chinese: 解振华; born 1949), Chinese politician who served as Vice-Chairman of the National Development and Reform Commission
 Xie Jingxian (Chinese: 解静娴; pinyin: Xiè Jìngxián) (born October 31, 1983), Chinese pianist
 Xie Zhong (Chinese: 解众; born September 19, 1998), Chinese pair skater
 Xie Xuegong (Chinese: 解学恭; Wade–Giles: Hsieh Hsueh-kung; October 6, 1916 – March 3, 1993), Chinese politician, also known as Xie Bin (Chinese: 谢宾)
 Xie Fei (Chinese: 解飛; fl. 334–349), Chinese inventor and scholar of the Later Zhao
 Chieh Yuan (1945 – 1977), Malaysian-born Hong Kong actor and martial artist

Fictional
 Xie Bao, a character in Water Margin

Chinese-language surnames
Individual Chinese surnames